Dolichos or Dolichus is derived from Ancient Greek δολιχός 'long'. It may refer to:
 Dolichus (beetle), a genus of insects
 Dolichos (plant), a genus of plants
 Dolichos (running race), a race in the ancient Olympics